Overalls or bib-and-brace overalls, also sometimes called dungarees in British English, are a type of garment usually used as protective clothing when working. The garments are commonly referred to as a "pair of overalls" by analogy with "pair of trousers".

Overalls were originally made of denim, but they can also be made of other materials such as corduroy, chino cloth, or leather. Overalls were invented in the mid to late 1890s by Grace Howard and Jacob W. Davis at Levi Strauss & Co., but they went through an evolution to reach their modern form. Initially created to serve as protective clothing during physically demanding work, they have since also become a fashion garment. Many high-fashion brands have released their own spin on overalls. They have been recommended as suitable wear for women whose body is changing after recently giving birth.

History

Beginnings 
The exact beginnings of the wearing of overalls are unclear, but they are mentioned in literature as early as 1776 as protective working garments commonly worn by slaves.

The first evidence of overalls being mass-produced are those made by Levi Strauss and Jacob Davis in the 1890s. The first "jeans" they invented were actually "waist-high overalls", consisting of denim pants with suspenders attached with buttons, but with no bib. From the beginning, denim overalls were popular workers' garments due to their durability. In fact, Levi Strauss & Co.'s slogan in the 1880s-1890s was "Never Rip, Never Tear".

In 1911, Harry David Lee made the first bib overalls, made of pants with pockets with a bib and straps over the shoulders.

In 1927, Lee's developed a "hook-less fastener" and created "button-less" overalls. Zippers replaced buttons. Soon after, suspender buttons were traded in for belt loops to attach over-the-shoulder straps.

The Overalls Movement of 1920 
In 1920, groups of "Overalls Clubs" formed around the United States. They took overalls as their symbol to protest the rising cost of clothing, and profiteering in the garment industry.

The Great Depression 
In the 1930s, the poorest segments of the American population wore overalls: farmers, miners, loggers, and railroad workers. They were most commonly worn by men and boys in the Southern and Midwestern United States. They can be seen in many of Walker Evans's photographs.

Modern history

Bib overalls (in different colors and textiles) became popular garments among American youth from the 1960s onward.

In the 21st century, overalls have evolved into high-fashion garments. Designers such as Stella McCartney include them in ready-to-wear collections for men, women, and children. McCartney's children's overalls sell for as much as US$138 in the US.

Brands 
Levi Strauss & Co. and Lee were not the only companies making overalls in the late 19th and 20th centuries.
 One of the oldest brands of overalls, OshKosh B'gosh, founded in 1895 in Wisconsin, specialized in blue-and-white "hickory-stripe" bib overalls. The company produced bib overalls for children in the late 1960s.
 Larned, Carter & Co., from Detroit, called themselves the "World's Greatest Overall Makers". They marketed their products as uniforms for railroad workers.
 One of the biggest overall manufacturers was Blue Bell, which began in North Carolina in 1904. It was popular among railroad workers.
 Jellico Clothing Manufacturing Co., later renamed Big Ben, was a major competitor of Blue Bell. Big Ben bought Blue Bell in 1926 and continued under the name Blue Bell. Blue Bell then bought the overalls company Casey Jones.

Garments adapted from overalls 

Shortalls (a contraction of the words "short" and "overalls") are with the lower part adapted into shorts.

Salopettes is the French word for bib-and-brace overalls. The word is used in English for a similar garment to overalls worn for sailing, skiing, diving, and other heavy-duty activities. They are made of wind-and-waterproof trousers, traditionally with a high waist reaching to the chest and held up by adjustable shoulder braces.

Historically, military "overalls" were loose garments worn in the 18th and early 19th centuries over soldiers' breeches and gaiters when on active service or in barracks. After 1823, the term was replaced by "trousers" in British Army documents, but it survives to the present day in reference to the tight-fitting garments strapped under the instep, worn as part of the mess dress and full dress uniforms of cavalry regiments.

References

External links 

Safety clothing
1890s fashion
20th-century fashion
21st-century fashion
Trousers and shorts